The TAZ 90 (TarnAnZug in German and TASS 90 in French) is the camouflage patterns for current standard issue battledress and service dress uniform of the Swiss Armed Forces.

History
The TAZ 90 was issued to the Swiss military in 1993 after the TAZ 83 had been phased out of service. ETH Zurich played a role in its creation, since the pattern was made to suit Swiss environment.

Pattern
The four-colour pattern consists of tan, brown, green and black and is a development of the Taz 57 and Taz 83 (the "Alpenflage") patterns which it replaced in the early 1990s. Even so, the pattern is based on the alpenflage, but with the deletion of the white spots and the red colour found in the alpenflage, along with minor changes.

Variants

Taz 90/06
In 2006, the Taz was changed to include Velcro insignia and Velcro name tabs (Taz 90/06).

Desert
A desert variant for Swiss troops working abroad in peacekeeping operations. Known sometimes as Südtarn or Wüstetarn, the variant was seen with Swiss troops in Kosovo in peacekeeping operations.

Replacement
A new design with improved color matching (black is removed in favor of a tan-like light brown) (Multiumfeldtarnmuster 16) will be introduced starting in 2022. The cost for its development is around CHF 250 million to replace the Taz 90/06.

Gallery

References

Bibliography
 

Military camouflage
Camouflage patterns
Military equipment of Switzerland
Military equipment introduced in the 1990s